Joseph Johnston (20 August 1890 – 1972) was an Irish academic, farmer, writer and politician.

He was born in 1890 in Toomog townland, Castlecaulfield, County Tyrone, to John Johnston, a national school teacher, and the former Mary Geddis. He came from a Presbyterian family of Ulster-Scots descent.

He was educated at Dungannon Royal School (1902–06), Trinity College Dublin (1906–10, BA (Mod) in Classics) and Lincoln College, Oxford (1910–12).

He supported Home Rule and was the author of Civil War in Ulster (1913) and The Nemesis of Economic Nationalism (1934). He became Professor of Applied Economics in Trinity College, Dublin in 1939.

He was first elected to Seanad Éireann as an independent member in 1938 by the Dublin University constituency. He was re-elected to the 2nd and 3rd Seanad but lost his at the 1943 election. He was elected to the 5th Seanad in 1944 and lost his seat at the 1948 election. He was nominated by the Taoiseach to the 7th Seanad in 1951 and lost his seat at the 1954 election.

H3 was the father of Irish theoretical physicist Roy Johnston, a republican activist who was later a member of the Official Irish Republican Army. His daughter, Dr Maureen Carmody, was a member of the National Executive of the Irish Labour Party for many years, and at one time an elected Labour member of Nenagh Town Council.

Books 
 1913 – "Civil War in Ulster - Its Objects & Probable Results", Sealy, Byers and Walker, Dublin
 1925 – "A Groundwork of Economics"
 1934 – "The Nemesis of Economic Nationalism", P.S. King & Son, London
 1951 – "Irish Agriculture in Transition", Hodges Figgis / Blackwell, Dublin
 1962 – "Why Ireland Needs the Common Market", Mercier Press, Cork
 1966 – "Irish Economic Headaches: A Diagnosis", Aisti Eireannachta
 1970 – "Bishop Berkeley's Querist in Historical Perspective", Dundalgan Press, Dundalk

References

1890 births
1972 deaths
Academics of Trinity College Dublin
Alumni of Lincoln College, Oxford
Alumni of Trinity College Dublin
Independent members of Seanad Éireann
20th-century Irish economists
Irish farmers
Irish people of Ulster-Scottish descent
Irish Presbyterians
Members of Seanad Éireann for Dublin University
Members of the 2nd Seanad
Members of the 3rd Seanad
Members of the 5th Seanad
Members of the 7th Seanad
Nominated members of Seanad Éireann
People educated at the Royal School Dungannon
Politicians from County Tyrone
Protestant Irish nationalists